Thomas Kyparissis (born 26 March 1970) is a Greek retired football player. He was a striker, who scored more than 150 goals in his entire career. He was a key player for AEL during the club's hard try to make it back to the first division from the third division from 2003 to 2005, and he continued to serve the team for two more seasons. Due to his strong mentality and passion, he was nicknamed "Psychara" (Big Soul) from Larissa's fans. From January 2007 he returned at his very first professional club and the team of his hometown, Pierikos. He retired a year later.

References

External links
 
 

1970 births
Living people
Greek footballers
Greece international footballers
Pierikos F.C. players
Xanthi F.C. players
Athlitiki Enosi Larissa F.C. players
Aris Thessaloniki F.C. players
PAS Giannina F.C. players
Korinthos F.C. players
Niki Volos F.C. players
Panelefsiniakos F.C. players
Association football forwards
Footballers from Katerini